Annan Castle, was a castle that was located on the banks of the River Annan, in Annan, Scotland.

A motte and bailey castle was built in the early 12th century by the de Brus family, Lords of Annandale. A flood in the mid-12th century changed the course of the River Annan, which caused the castle mound to be partially eroded. The castle was abandoned as the main seat of the de Brus family, who moved to Lochmaben Castle.

In February 1552 a master mason David Dog was sent by Regent Arran to hire stonemasons to work "at the tour of Annand".

The site of the castle is designated a scheduled ancient monument.

External links
The Mote of Annan and Annan Castle

Citations

Castles in Dumfries and Galloway
Buildings and structures in Dumfries and Galloway
Demolished buildings and structures in Scotland
Former castles in Scotland
Scheduled Ancient Monuments in Dumfries and Galloway
Annan, Dumfries and Galloway